A Sound of Lightning is a 1976 novel written by Australian author Jon Cleary and set in Montana.

References

External links
The novel was serialised in 6 parts in The Australian Women's Weekly – Part 1, Part 4, Part 5, Part 6
National Library of Australia - A Sound of Lightning

1976 Australian novels
Novels set in Montana
William Collins, Sons books
William Morrow and Company books
Novels by Jon Cleary